Nesoscopa is a genus of moths belonging to the subfamily Tortricinae of the family Tortricidae.

Species
Nesoscopa exsors Meyrick, 1926
Nesoscopa psarodes Bradley, 1962

See also
List of Tortricidae genera

References

External links
tortricidae.com

Tortricidae genera